Dreamland is the debut studio album by Robert Miles. It was released on 7 June 1996 to critical acclaim in Europe, where it was a hit, and was also released in the United States about a month later, with a new track sung by Maria Nayler, "One and One." This new track became very popular and was later released as a single in the US and Germany.

At the end of 1996, Miles released a new version of Dreamland, called Dreamland – The Winter Edition, in Germany. It was largely similar to Dreamland, but contains the tracks "For Us" and "One and One" (which was not released on the European version) and removes "Fable (Dream Version)", and was also released in Japan. Nowadays it appears that the US version of Dreamland including "One and One" (with "One and One" being the sixth track, coming after "In My Dreams" and before "Princess of Light") is the most popular and common version.

After Robert Miles' death, the album was remastered to match the original track listings with the bonus songs "For Us" and "One & One" added at the end of the album.

Track listings

Original issue

US version

The Winter Edition

Remastered Edition

Charts and certifications

Weekly Charts

Year-end Charts

Certifications

References

External links 
 Dreamland at Discogs
 Profile of Dreamland at Saltrecords.com

Robert Miles albums
1996 debut albums
Arista Records albums